Nádine Hoffeldt (born 28 February 1982) is a South African Afrikaans pop singer and presenter, best known for the hit song "Kaapse Draai". She has also recorded a number of songs in English.

Life and career 
Nádine was born in Durban Starting her career as a teenager in 1996, she has released twelve albums and two DVDs. In 1997 she toured South Africa with Dutch singer Jan Smit, when her then manager Ian Bossert brought him to the country. She also performed at the "Two Nations" concert in 1997, along with the Spice Girls and Billy Ocean, for an audience that included Nelson Mandela and Prince Charles.

Nádine released her seventh solo album, Mense soos jy, in September 2005. Her Nádine 10 Years Live was nominated for Best DVD in the 2006 South African Music Awards (SAMA). To date, each of Nádine's albums has produced a successful song, with the latest being "Skildery".

Nádine released her eighth album, As Jy Wonder, produced by international songwriter and producer Steve Taylor. 

Nádine has recorded a number of hit songs, including "Dankie liewe Ouma", "Hoor hoe klop my hart", "Kom dans met my", "Latina", "’n Meisiekind wil ek graag bly", "Die Hemel Brand", "Alweer Iemand Anders", "Afrika Spore" and "Vive la Vida". 

In 2010, she released her album This Time I Know, containing the singles "This Time I Know It's For Real" and "Made Up My Mind", the latter being an English language cover of "Delete" by Younha. Her song "I Can Have You" was covered in Korean by f(x), who titled it "Mr. Boogie". 

In 2015 she began to present the Afrikaans music game show Musiek Roulette produced by Johan Stemmet, presenter of its sister-show Noot vir Noot. Musiek Roulette is currently airing season 6.

Discography 
Krappies & Krefies
Nádine
You & I
44 Jongste Gunstelinge
Simply Me
Kaapse Draai Remix
Mense Soos Jy
As Jy Wonder
Nádine 10 Years Live DVD
This Time I Know
 2011: Eindeloos
 Live in Europe DVD
 2012: Christmas in South Africa
 2014: Skildery

References

External links 
Official web site

1982 births
Afrikaans-language singers
Living people
21st-century South African women singers
South African pop singers